White Legion is a 1936 American drama film written and directed by Karl Brown. The film stars Ian Keith, Tala Birell, Ferdinand Gottschalk, Suzanne Kaaren, Lionel Pape, Rollo Lloyd, Teru Shimada and Nigel De Brulier. The film was released on October 25, 1936, by Grand National Films Inc.

Plot

Cast           
Ian Keith as Dr. Julian Murray
Tala Birell as Dr. Sterne
Ferdinand Gottschalk as Dr. Fontaine
Suzanne Kaaren as Gloria Blank
Lionel Pape as Dr. Travis
Rollo Lloyd as The Colonel
Teru Shimada as Dr. Nogi 
Nigel De Brulier as Father Gonzales
Nina Campana as Maria
Warner Richmond as Burke
Ferdinand Munier as Sen. Blank
Harry Allen as McKenzie
Don Barclay as Miggs
Snub Pollard as Baker 
Robert Warwick as Capt. Parker

References

External links
 

1936 films
American drama films
1936 drama films
Grand National Films films
Films directed by Karl Brown
American black-and-white films
1930s English-language films
1930s American films